Storgozia Nunatak (‘Nunatak Storgozia’ \'nu-na-tak stor-'go-zi-ya\) is the rocky hill rising to 593 m in eastern Desudava Glacier on Nordenskjöld Coast in Graham Land, Antarctica.

The feature is named after the ancient town of Storgosia in northern Bulgaria.

Location
British mapping in 1978.

Maps
 Antarctic Digital Database (ADD). Scale 1:250000 topographic map of Antarctica. Scientific Committee on Antarctic Research (SCAR). Since 1993, regularly upgraded and updated.

Notes

References
 Storgozia Nunatak. SCAR Composite Antarctic Gazetteer.
 Bulgarian Antarctic Gazetteer. Antarctic Place-names Commission. (details in Bulgarian, basic data in English)

External links
 Storgozia Nunatak. Copernix satellite image

Nunataks of Graham Land
Nordenskjöld Coast
Bulgaria and the Antarctic
Pleven